Juan Ignacio Sills (born 4 May 1987) is an Argentine football defender who plays for Deportes Iquique in the Primera B de Chile.

Career
Formed in Vélez Sársfield's youth divisions, Sills joined Costa Rican Primera División club LD Alajuelense on loan in 2008, before making any first team appearance with Vélez. He returned to his club in 2009.

Sills did his first pre-season training with Vélez' first team during July 2010. However, he suffered a knee cruciate ligament injury that made him miss the entire 2010 Apertura tournament.

For the first half of 2012, Sills played on loan for Instituto in the Primera B Nacional (Argentine second division), where he started in 21 games in his team's third-place finish. However, his team lost the promotion playoff to San Lorenzo and therefore could not achieve promotion to the Primera División. Upon his return to Vélez, he was part of the squad that won both the 2012 Inicial and 2012–13 Superfinal.

Sills then went on to play for Universidad de Chile and Olimpo.

Honours
Vélez Sársfield
Argentine Primera División (3): 2011 Clausura, 2012 Inicial, 2012–13 Superfinal

References

External links
 Juan Sills at Vélez Sársfield's official website 
 Juan Sills at BDFA.com.ar 
 Juan Ignacio Sills – Argentine Primera statistics at Fútbol XXI  
 

1987 births
Living people
Argentine footballers
Argentine expatriate footballers
Association football defenders
Sportspeople from Buenos Aires Province
L.D. Alajuelense footballers
Club Atlético Vélez Sarsfield footballers
Instituto footballers
Universidad de Chile footballers
Olimpo footballers
Newell's Old Boys footballers
Club Atlético Huracán footballers
Ferro Carril Oeste footballers
Deportes Iquique footballers
Argentine Primera División players
Liga FPD players
Chilean Primera División players
Argentine expatriate sportspeople in Costa Rica
Argentine expatriate sportspeople in Chile
Expatriate footballers in Costa Rica
Expatriate footballers in Chile